Waterhouses railway station, on the Deerness Valley Railway,  south of the village of Esh Winning in County Durham, England, was opened on 1 November 1877 by the North Eastern Railway. The station served as the passenger terminus of the line, although goods wagons continued to East Hedley Hope and Waterhouses collieries.

In 1914 Connie Lewcock, who led the local suffragettes, assisted by Joss Craddock burnt down the railway building at Esh Winning. Lewcock had designed a system that gave her an alibi. By the time the wooden building was alight she had an alibi. She was assisted by a miner named Joss Craddock. The building burnt down but the Police could not make formal charges as she had witnesses who could testify that she was with them at the time of the fire. Lewcock became a popular politician and she was appointed an OBE in the New Years Honours List in 1966.

The station closed to passengers on 29 October 1951, and freight on 28 December 1964.

The stone and timber built station was demolished and the site is now a park. The trackbed now forms part of the Deerness Valley Railway Path.

References

External links
 Waterhouses station on navigable 1948 O. S. map

Disused railway stations in County Durham
Former North Eastern Railway (UK) stations
Railway stations in Great Britain opened in 1877
Railway stations in Great Britain closed in 1951
Esh Winning